Multidendrolaelaps putte is a species of mite first found in Finland.

The used sample was taken from a decaying trunk of aspen in 2007-09-07. According to the discoverers, the name M. putte is a reference to the Finnish abbreviation of the title of the project which made the study possible.

References

Digamasellidae
Animals described in 2010